Marwan Hage (Marwān Ḥāja) (born September 14, 1981) is a former offensive lineman who played for the Hamilton Tiger-Cats of the Canadian Football League. Hage played college football for the Colorado Buffaloes. He emigrated from Beirut, Lebanon to Montreal in 1990.  Participated in the Jacksonville Jaguars' 2004 training camp. During his retirement announcement in 2014, Hage revealed that he would become the owner of two Tim Hortons franchises in Toronto, Ontario.

Professional career

Hamilton Tiger-Cats

Hage was selected by the Tiger-Cats in second round of the 2004 CFL Draft. In 2006, he founded the Hage's Heroes program which sends under-privileged children to Hamilton Tiger-Cats home games.  In 2009, he was awarded the Tom Pate Memorial Award for his contributions to the Hamilton community. He was named a CFL East All-Star in 2007 and a CFLPA (Canadian Football League Players Association) All-Star in 2007 and 2008. He also won the Leo Dandurand Trophy in 2010 as the Most Outstanding Lineman in the East Division. During the final game played at Ivor Wynne Stadium, Hage was named to the All-Time Hamilton Tiger-Cats Team. He also was a member of the Hamilton Tiger-Cats 2013 East Division championship team and played in the 2013 Grey Cup.

Ottawa Redblacks
He was acquired by the Ottawa Redblacks in the third round of the 2013 CFL Expansion Draft. Instead of playing for the RedBlacks, Hage announced his retirement on April 14, 2014. On Tuesday, May 13, his playing rights were acquired by the Calgary Stampeders along with the first overall selection in the 2014 CFL Draft in exchange for Jon Gott.

Politics
Hage is seeking the Conservative Party of Canada nomination in Hamilton East—Stoney Creek for the next Canadian federal election.

References 

1981 births
Living people
Canadian football offensive linemen
American football offensive linemen
Canadian people of Lebanese descent
Colorado Buffaloes football players
Jacksonville Jaguars players
Hamilton Tiger-Cats players
Ottawa Redblacks players
Sportspeople from Beirut
Canadian football people from Montreal
Canadian players of American football
Lebanese players of American football
Lebanese players of Canadian football
Canadian sportsperson-politicians
Sportspeople of Lebanese descent